The vastus lateralis, also called the vastus externus, is the largest and most powerful part of the quadriceps femoris, a muscle in the thigh. Together with other muscles of the quadriceps group, it serves to extend the knee joint, moving the lower leg forward. It arises from a series of flat, broad tendons attached to the femur, and attaches to the outer border of the patella. It ultimately joins with the other muscles that make up the quadriceps in the quadriceps tendon, which travels over the knee to connect to the tibia. The vastus lateralis is the recommended site for intramuscular injection in infants less than 7 months old and those unable to walk, with loss of muscular tone.

Structure 
The vastus lateralis muscle arises from several areas of the femur, including the upper part of the intertrochanteric line; the lower, anterior borders of the greater trochanter, to the outer border of the gluteal tuberosity, and the upper half of the outer border of the linea aspera. These form an aponeurosis, a broad flat tendon that covers the upper three-quarters of the muscle. From the inner surface of the aponeurosis, many muscle fibers originate. Some additional fibers arise from the tendon of the gluteus maximus muscle, and from the septum between the vastus lateralis and short head of the biceps femoris.

The fibers form a large fleshy mass, attached to a second strong aponeurosis, placed on the deep surface of the lower part of the muscle. This lower aponeurosis becomes contracted and thickened into a flat tendon that attaches to the outer border of the patella, and subsequently joins with the quadriceps femoris tendon, expanding the capsule of the knee-joint.

Innervation
The vastus lateralis muscle is innervated by the muscular branches of the femoral nerve (L2, L3, and L4).

Additional images

References

External links

PTCentral

Knee extensors
Muscles of the quadriceps
Anterior compartment of thigh
Muscles of the lower limb